Simcere Pharmaceutical Group or Simcere Pharmaceutical is an innovation and R&D-driven pharmaceutical company with a mission of “providing today’s patients with medicines of the future.” It has established a National Key Laboratory of Translational Medicine and Innovative Drug Development. The company focuses on three therapeutic areas including oncology, central nervous system and autoimmune diseases with forward-looking layout of disease areas that may have significant clinical needs in the future. Leveraging its R&D capability and commercialization excellence, Simcere has built a market-leading product portfolio in China. Its vigorous in-house R&D efforts and extensive R&D collaborations have made it a strategic cooperation partner with world leading innovative companies and research institutes. The company has been continuously recognized as one of the “Top Innovative Pharmaceutical Enterprises in China” and “Top 100 Pharmaceutical Manufacturing Enterprises of China”.

History
1995 - 2005: Manufacturer and supplier of branded generics

 1995 Company established

 2001 Became a pharmaceutical company with independent R&D capability

2006 - 2015: Engaged in Generic and Innovative Drug Development

 2006 Endostar® (Recombinant human endostatin) launched

 2007 NYSE listing

 2012 Iremod® (Iguratimod) launched 

2015 - present: Innovative Drug Driven Company

 2018 Shanghai Innovation Center established

 2019 Boston Innovation Center established

 2020 Sanbexin® (Edaravone and Dexborneol) and Orencia® (Abatacept) launched; HKSE listing

 2021 Enweida® (Envafolimab) launched

Products
The company strategically focuses on 3 Major Therapeutic Areas including oncology, central nervous system, autoimmune disease, with forward-looking layout of disease areas that may have significant clinical needs.

Simcere currently has a portfolio of dozens of market leading pharmaceutical products. Over 10 products are recommended in more than 40 clinical practice guidelines and pathways issued by government authorities or prestigious professional associations in China, and over 40 products are included in the Chinese national reimbursement drug list (NRDL).

Sanbexin®
Edaravone and Dexborneol Concentrated Solution for Injection, independently developed by Simcere with proprietary intellectual property right is indicated to alleviate neurological symptoms and dysfunction of daily activities caused by acute ischemic stroke. Sanbexin has been the only pharmaceutical for the treatment of stroke which has obtained the approval for sale since 2015 worldwide.

As a Chinese category 1 innovative drug, Sanbexin can improve the neurological function of patients with strokes by inhibiting the dual mechanisms of oxidative stress damage and inflammatory damage. Data from Phase III clinical study has been published in Stroke (journal). A total of approximately 1,200 acute ischemic stroke patients were included in a randomized, double-blind, positive controlled trial for head-to-head comparison of Sanbexin and edaravone monotherapy. Data shows that Sanbexin® has the efficacy advantage and is fairly safe.

It has received national special support for "Major New Drug Creation Projects" by the Ministry of Science and Technology and been awarded as one of “China’s Milestone Medical Achievements During the 13th Five-Year Plan Period”. It is included in NRDL since 2020;

Iremod®
(Iremod® (iguratimod) tablet) independently developed by Simcere is the first iguratimod approved for sales in the world and the only iguratimod approved for sales in China. It has been included in the NRDL since 2017 and is recommended as the primary therapy drug for the treatment of active rheumatoid arthritis by a number of clinical practice guidelines and pathways issued by the National Health Commission, Chinese Medical Association, Asia Pacific League of Associations for Rheumatology and the Ministry of Health, Labour and Welfare of Japan. 

In March 2021, the results of the phase IV prospective real-world study on Iremod® were published online in The Lancet Regional Health-Western Pacific, a sub publication of The Lancet. 1,759 patients were enrolled in this study, which made up for the lack of evidence of large-sample IGU in China and provided a new guiding basis for clinical safe and rational drug use.

Endostar®
Indicated for treatment of non-small cell lung cancer, Endostar® is the first proprietary anti-angiogenic targeted drug in China and the only endostatin approved for sale in worldwide. Endostar inhibits tumor growth by its antiangiogenic effect, and has won the Second Prize of National Scientific and Technological Progress Award, and China Patent Gold Award.

Endostar® has been included in the NRDL since 2017 and is recommended as a first-line treatment for patients with advanced non-small-cell lung carcinoma (NSCLC) by a number of oncology clinical practice guidelines.

Envafolimab
Approved to the market in China since Nov 2021, Envafolimab (Enweida®)is the world's first single-domain PD-L1 antibody formulated for subcutaneous injection (SC) and the first immunotherapy approved in China indicated for MSI-H tumor regardless of tumor type, with the advantages of short administration time and good safety.

It is indicated for adult patients with advanced solid tumors who have unresectable or metastatic microsatellite instability-high (MSI-H) or DNA mismatch repair-deficient (dMMR), including those patients with advanced colorectal cancer who have experienced disease progression after being treated with fluorouracil, oxaliplatin and irinotecan previously, as well as other patients with advanced solid tumors who have experienced disease progression after previous treatment and no satisfactory treatment alternatives. 

On March 30, 2020, Simcere entered a tripartite cooperation agreement in relation to Envafolimab with 3D (Beijing) Medicines and Jiangsu Alphamab and obtained the exclusive right to promote Envafolimab for all oncology indications in mainland China.

Other marketed products

Simcere collaborated with Bristol-Myers Squibb (BMS) to develop and commercialize Orencia® (abatacept injection) in China since 2013. The drug is approved by NMPA in 2020 and became the first and only soluble CTLA4-Fc fusion protein approved for sale in China as treatment of rheumatoid arthritis. 

Other branded products of Simcere include Jepaso®: Nedaplatin for Injection, JIEBAILI®: Pemetrexed Disodium for Injection, Enlength®: Bortezomib for Injection, AIJIEWEI®: Tofacitinib Citrate Tablets, Softan®: rosuvastatin calcium tablets, Antine®: diclofenac sodium sustained release capsules/gel, ZAILIN®: amoxicillin granules/dispersible tablets/capsules, BIQI®: Diosmectite Powder etc.

Pursuit of innovation 
In the rapid transitioning towards an innovation driven company, Simcere has established four innovation centers globally, located in Nanjing, Shanghai, Beijing and Boston.

For the years of 2019, 2020, and 2021, Simcere's R&D costs accounted for 14.2%, 25.3%, and 28.3% respectively, of its total revenue for the same periods. 

As of March 2022, the company maintains a new drug R&D pipeline of nearly 60 innovative projects, with 19 innovative drug projects in the clinical stage.

Partnering and global alliances 
Simcere collaborates extensively with domestic and foreign R&D partners to develop innovative medicines. It is striving to become a strategic "partner of choice" with world leading pharmaceutical companies and biotechnology companies, in an effort to bring more global life science breakthroughs to China.

Collaboration highlights: 

G1 Therapeutics

Collaborate to introduce COSELATM (Trilaciclib), an innovative anti-tumor and myeloprotection therapy.

Bristol-Myers Squibb

Co-development of Orencia® (Abatacept injection), the innovative drug in the field of autoimmune diseases.

Kazia Therapeutics

Co-development of Paxalisib, which was granted Fast Track Designation for glioblastoma by the US FDA in August 2020.

Vivoryon Therapeutics

Collaborate to develop and commercialize Varoglutamstat, an orally administered small molecule inhibitor for Alzheimer's disease.

Apexigen

Co-development of Suvencitug, a humanized monoclonal antibody directed against VEGF.

Avilex Pharma

Collaboration on AVLX-144, an innovative drug for acute ischemic stroke (AIS).

Aeromics

Co-development of a potent inhibitor of AQP4 water channels for the treatment of novel therapy with Nobel-winning mechanism to treat cerebral edema in China.

JW Pharmaceutical

Collaboration on URC-102, a selective inhibitor of uric acid transporter (URAT-1) for gout in China.

3D-Medicines & Alphamab Oncology

A strategic collaboration to develop and commercialize Enweida® (Envafolimab), the world’s first subcutaneously injected PD-L1 antibody.

NeuronDawn

Collaborate to develop Sanbexin® (Edaravone and Dexborneol) sublingual tablet for stroke.

Daiichi-Sankyo

Strategic partnership for the exclusive commercialization of Olmetec Plus® ( Olmesartan medoxomil, Hydrochlorothiazide) in China.

Shanghai Institute of Materia Medica, Chinese Academy of Sciences

Co-development of a novel antiviral drug targeting 3CL protease to treat COVID-19.

Lynk Pharmaceuticals

Partnering to develop and commercialize a highly selective JAK1 inhibitor for the indications of rheumatoid arthritis and ankylosing spondylitis in China.

References

Civilian-run enterprises of China
Pharmaceutical companies of China
Manufacturing companies based in Nanjing
Companies listed on the New York Stock Exchange
Generic drug manufacturers